La Trinité is a commune in the Manche department in Normandy in north-western France.

Heraldry

See also
Communes of the Manche department

References

Trinite